Giorgio Brambilla (born 19 September 1988) is an Italian former cyclist.

Major results

2005
 1st Stage 2 Grand Prix Rüebliland
 3rd Trofeo Guido Dorigo
2006
 2nd Overall Grand Prix Rüebliland
2007
 7th GP Waregem
2008
 2nd Paris–Roubaix Espoirs
2009
 3rd Paris–Roubaix Espoirs
 4th Gran Premio Inda
2010
 7th GP Costa Degli Etruschi
2012
 1st Dorpenomloop Rucphen
 4th GP Costa Degli Etruschi
 5th Sparkassen Münsterland Giro
 6th Nokere Koerse
 6th Antwerpse Havenpijl
 10th Omloop van het Houtland
2013
 3rd Overall Paris–Arras Tour
 4th Overall Tour of China II

References

1988 births
Living people
Italian male cyclists
Sportspeople from Lecco
Cyclists from the Province of Lecco